Amyema plicatula is a species of hemi-parasitic shrub found in the Bismarck Archipelago, New Guinea, New South Wales and Queensland.

Description
It is an aeria,l stem-parasitic shrub, with short epicortical runners. The leaves, which are usually opposite, are elliptic to obovate, and about 5.5-11 cm by 3-8 cm, with no  obvious venation. They  sometimes occur in whorls of 3 to 4, on short stalks which are 0.4-0.8 cm long.

The flowers occur in umbels. The primary stalk of the inflorescence is about 12-20 mm long, with the stalks  in the umbels being about 5-10 mm long. The flowers in their diads or triads are stalkless. The calyx lobes are inconspicuous or non-existent. The corolla lobes are red, and about 20-23 mm by 8-10 mm. The anthers are about 3 mm long on anther filaments which are about 8 mm long.  The style is about 20 mm long.

The ovary is about 2-3 mm long, and the fruits are ellipsoid to obovoid,  about 7-10 mm long, and the calyx limb and style often persists at the apex of the fruit.

Distribution
In New South Wales it is found in remnant rainforests of the North Coast. In Queensland it is known from just one collection in the north east  Outside Australia it has been found in rainforests and open humid forests from sea level to 1600 metres.

Taxonomy
Amyema plicatula is member of the Santalales, the mistletoe order, placed within the family Loranthaceae. It was first described as  Loranthus plicatulus by Kurt Krause from a specimen collected in New Guinea, but was transferred from the genus Loranthus in 1929 by Danser.

The genus name, Amyema, is derived from Greek for 'without' and 'to instruct'.

Host plants 
Downey records just one host, Dysoxylum fraseranum, in the Meliaceae family.

References

External links
Amyema plicatula (NSW PlantNET) (for images & description)
Flora Malesiana, vol. 13: 266 f. 8 e (1974) (Figure 8.e shows the inflorescence of A. plicatula)
Amyema plicatula occurrence data from the Australasian Virtual Herbarium 

Parasitic plants
plicatula
Flora of New Guinea
Flora of Queensland
Flora of New South Wales
Plants described in 1923